is a Japanese and North American English term used in parts of the world such as South America and North America to specify the children of children born to ethnic Japanese in a new country of residence. The nisei are considered the second generation; grandchildren of the Japanese-born immigrants are called Sansei; and the fourth generation is called yonsei.  The children of at least one nisei parent are called Sansei and are usually the first generation of whom a high percentage are mixed race since their parents were usually themselves born and raised in America.

The character and uniqueness of the sansei is recognized in its social history.

In various countries

Although the earliest organized group of Japanese emigrants settled in Mexico in 1897, the four largest populations of Japanese and descendants of Japanese immigrants are in Brazil, the United States, Canada, and Peru.

Brazilian Sansei

Brazil is home to the largest Japanese population outside Japan, with an estimate of more than 1.5 million of them (including those of mixed-race or mixed-ethnicity), more than that of the 1.2 million in the United States.  The Sansei Japanese Brazilians are an important part of that ethnic minority in that nation in South America.

American Sansei
 
Most American Sansei were born during the Baby Boom after the end of World War II, but older Sansei who were living in the western United States during the war were forcibly incarcerated with their parents (Nisei) and grandparents (Issei) after Executive Order 9066 was promulgated to exclude everyone of Japanese descent from the West Coast and from Southern Arizona. The Sansei were forceful activists in the redress movement in the 1980s, which resulted in an official apology to the internees.  In some senses, the Sansei seem to feel they are caught in a dilemma between their "quiet" Nisei parents and their other identity model of "verbal" Americans.

In the United States, a representative Sansei is General Eric Shinseki (born November 28, 1942), the 34th Chief of Staff of the United States Army (1999–2003) and former United States Secretary of Veterans Affairs. He is the first Asian American in US history to be a four-star general, and the first to lead one of the four US military services.

Canadian Sansei
 
Within Japanese-Canadian communities across Canada, three distinct subgroups developed, each with different sociocultural referents, generational identity, and wartime experiences.

Peruvian Sansei
 
Among the approximately 80,000 Peruvians of Japanese descent, the Sansei Japanese Peruvians comprise the largest number.

Cultural profile

Generations 
Japanese-Americans and Japanese-Canadians have special names for each of their generations in North America. These are formed by combining one of the Japanese numbers corresponding to the generation with the Japanese word for generation (sei 世). The Japanese-American and Japanese-Canadian communities have themselves distinguished their members with terms like Issei, Nisei and Sansei which describe the first, second and third generation of immigrants. The fourth generation is called Yonsei (四世) and the fifth is called Gosei (五世).  The Issei, Nisei and Sansei generations reflect distinctly different attitudes to authority, gender, non-Japanese involvement, religious belief and practice and other matters. The age when individuals faced the wartime evacuation and internment is the single, most significant factor which explains these variations in their experiences, attitudes and behaviour patterns.  

The term Nikkei (日系) encompasses all of the world's Japanese immigrants across generations.   The collective memory of the Issei and older Nisei was an image of Meiji Japan from 1870 through 1911, which contrasted sharply with the Japan that newer immigrants had more recently left.  These differing attitudes, social values and associations with Japan were often incompatible with each other.  In this context, the significant differences in post-war experiences and opportunities did nothing to mitigate the gaps which separated generational perspectives.

In North America since the redress victory in 1988, a significant evolutionary change has occurred.  The Sansei, their parents, their grandparents, and their children are changing the way they look at themselves and their pattern of accommodation to the non-Japanese majority.

There are currently just over one hundred thousand British Japanese, mostly in London; but unlike other Nikkei communities elsewhere in the world, these Britons do not conventionally parse their communities in generational terms as Issei, Nisei or Sansei.

Sansei
The third generation of immigrants, born in the United States or Canada to parents born in the United States or Canada, is called Sansei (三世). Children born to the Nisei were generally born after 1945. They speak English as their first language and are completely acculturized in the contexts of Canadian or American society. They tend to identify with Canadian or American values, norms and expectations. Few speak Japanese and most tend to express their identity as Canadian or American rather than Japanese. Among the Sansei there is an overwhelming percentage of marriages to persons of non-Japanese ancestry.

Aging
The kanreki (還暦), a traditional, pre-modern Japanese rite of passage to old age at 60, was sometimes celebrated by the Issei and is now being celebrated by increasing numbers of Nisei and a few Sansei. Rituals are enactments of shared meanings, norms, and values and this  Japanese rite of passage highlights a collective response among the Nisei to the conventional dilemmas of growing older.

History

Internment and redress

Some responded to internment with lawsuits and political action; and for others, poetry became an unplanned consequence:
With new hope.
We build new lives.
Why complain when it rains?
This is what it means to be free.
 -- Lawson Fusao Inada, Japanese American Historical Plaza, Portland, Oregon.

Life under United States policies before and after World War II

Politics

The sansei became known as the "activist generation" because of their large hand in the redress movement and individuals that have become a part of the American mainstream political landscape.

Notable individuals 

The numbers of sansei who have earned some degree of public recognition has continued to increase over time; but the quiet lives of those whose names are known only to family and friends are no less important in understanding the broader narrative of the Nikkei. Although the names highlighted here are over-represented by sansei from North America, the Latin American member countries of the Pan American Nikkei Association (PANA) include Argentina, Bolivia, Brazil, Chile, Colombia, Mexico, Paraguay, Peru, Uruguay, in addition to the English-speaking United States and Canada.
 

 Francis Fukuyama
 Robert S. Hamada
 Ryan Higa 
 Mike Honda
 Kaisei Ichiro
 Lawson Fusao Inada
 Soji Kashiwagi
 Janice Kawaye 
 Kyle Larson
 Doris Matsui
 Robert Matsui
 Dale Minami
 Patsy Mink
 Kent Nagano
 Suzy Nakamura
 Desmond Nakano
 Lane Nishikawa
 Linda Nishio
 Bev Oda

 Sophie Oda 
 Steven Okazaki
 Yuji Okumoto
 Ellison Onizuka
 Pete Rouse
 Lenn Sakata<ref>Nakagawa, Kerry Yo.   "Through a Diamond: 100 years of Japanese American Baseball, p. 123.]</ref>
 Roger Shimomura
 Mike Shinoda
 Eric Shinseki
 David Suzuki
 Ronald Takaki
 Mark Takano
 Dan Tani
 Chris Tashima
 David Tsubouchi
 Gedde Watanabe 
 Kristi Yamaguchi
 Jan Yanehiro

 See also 

Notes

References
 Harth, Erica. (2003). Last Witnesses: Reflections on the Wartime Internment of Japanese Americans. New York: Macmillan.  ;  OCLC 46364694
 Hosokowa, Fumiko. (1978). The Sansei: Social Interaction and Ethnic Identification Among the Third Generation Japanese. San Francisco: R & E Research Associates.  ;  OCLC 4057372
 Itoh, Keiko. (2001). The Japanese Community in Pre-War Britain: From Integration to Disintegration. Richmond, Surrey: Curzon. ;  OCLC 48937604
 Leslie, Gerald R. and Sheila K. Korman. (1967). The Family in Social Context.  New York: Oxford University Press. OCLC 530549
 Makabe, Tomoko. (1998). The Canadian Sansei. Toronto: University of Toronto Press. ; ;  OCLC 39523777
 McLellan, Janet. (1999). Many Petals of the Lotus: Five Asian Buddhist Communities in Toronto. Toronto: University of Toronto Press. ; ;  OCLC 43521129
 Nomura, Gail M. (1998).  "Japanese American Women," in The Reader's Companion to U.S. Women's History (Mankiller, Barbara Smith, ed.). Boston: Houghton Mifflin. ;  OCLC 43338598
 Sowell, Thomas. (1981). Ethnic America: A History. New York: Basic Books. ;  OCLC 7306301
 Takahashi, Jere. (1997). Nisei Sansei: Shifting Japanese American Identities and Politics. Philadelphia: Temple University Press. ;  OCLC 37180842
 Tamura, Eileen and Roger Daniels. (1994). Americanization, Acculturation, and Ethnic Identity: The Nisei Generation in Hawaii. Urbana: University of Illinois Press. ; ;  OCLC 27383373
 Zweigenhaft, Richard L. and G. William Domhoff. (2006). Diversity in the Power Elite: How it Happened, Why it Matters. Lanham, Maryland: Rowman & Littlefield.  ; ;  OCLC 62281556

 Further reading 
 Gehrie, Mark Joshua. (1973). Sansei: An Ethnography of Experience (Ph.D. thesis,  Anthropology). Evanston, Illinois: Northwestern University.  OCLC 71849646
 Kaihara, Rodney and Patricia Morgan. (1973). Sansei Experience. San Fullerton, Calif. : Oral History Program, California State University, Fullerton.  OCLC 23352676
 Oana, Leilani Kyoko. (1984). Ethnocultural Identification in Sansei (Third Generation Japanese American) Females: An Evaluation of Alternative Measures (M.A. thesis). Washington, D.C.: George Washington University.  OCLC 12726534
 Okamura, Randall F. (1978). The Contemporary Sansei (M.A. thesis, Community Development and Public Service).  San Francisco: Lone Mountain College.  OCLC 13182634
 Tanaka, Shaun Naomi. (2003). Ethnic Identity in the Absence of Propinquity Sansei and the Transformation of the Japanese-Canadian Community'' (M.A. thesis). Kingston, Ontario: Queen's University Press. [https://www.worldcat.org/oclc/60673221 OCLC 60673221

External links

 Japanese American National Museum;  JANM generational teas
 Embassy of Japan in Washington, DC
 Japanese American Citizens League

Japanese words and phrases
Japanese diaspora
Japanese-American history
Cultural generations

fr:Sansei